Neocrepidodera rhaetica is a species of flea beetle from Chrysomelidae family that can be found in Austria, France, Italy, Slovenia, Switzerland.

References

Beetles described in 1860
Beetles of Europe
rhaetica